The men's large hill team competition of the Beijing 2022 Olympics was held on 14 February, at the Snow Ruyi hill in Zhangjiakou. Austria became the Olympic champion, with Slovenia and germany being the silver and bronze medalist, respectively.

The defending champion are Norway. The silver medalist is Germany, and the bronze medalist are Poland. Germany are the 2021 World champion. Austria and Poland are the silver and bronze medalists, respectively. Only three men's team events were held in the framework of the 2021–22 FIS Ski Jumping World Cup before the Olympics; two were won by Austria and one by Slovenia.

Schedule

Competition

Qualification

Results

References

Ski jumping at the 2022 Winter Olympics
Men's events at the 2022 Winter Olympics